Milligan, also called South Waveland, is an unincorporated community in Greene Township, Parke County, in the U.S. state of Indiana.

History
A post office was established at Milligan in 1882, and remained in operation until 1957. The community was named for Joseph Milligan, a storekeeper.

Geography

References

Unincorporated communities in Indiana
Unincorporated communities in Parke County, Indiana